Tri Hartanto is an Indonesian professional basketball player.

Club career
Tri Hartanto joined Bali United under head coach Aleksandar Stefanovski in November 2020. Before that, he had played for Pelita Jaya.

He joined his new team shortly after Yerikho Tuasela from Pacific Caesar Surabaya and Suriliyadin from Prawira Bandung.

National team career
Tri Hartanto capped for the Indonesian national basketball team on several occasions such as the William Jones Cup.

References

External links
Tri Hartanto at Indonesian Basketball League (IBL) 

Tri Hartanto at Eurobasket.com

1989 births
Living people
Centers (basketball)
Indonesian men's basketball players
People from Salatiga